Francisco Viladomat (4 October 1926 – 8 May 2005) was a Spanish alpine skier. He competed at the 1952 Winter Olympics and the 1956 Winter Olympics.

References

External links
 

1926 births
2005 deaths
Spanish male alpine skiers
Olympic alpine skiers of Spain
Alpine skiers at the 1952 Winter Olympics
Alpine skiers at the 1956 Winter Olympics
People from Vallès Occidental
Sportspeople from the Province of Barcelona
20th-century Spanish people